"INTENTION" was Kenichi Suzumura's debut single, released in his album, "Becoming."

Release
It was released on October 8, 2008.

Chart performance
It peaked at #14 on the Oricon charts.

Track listing

2008 singles
Kenichi Suzumura songs
2008 songs
Lantis (company) singles